FC SPb KLS, also Saint-Petersburg Sports lovers circle (shortly СПБ КЛС) or just Sport — is a sport club from Saint-Petersburg, which was formed in 1888.

The soccer team was organized on 1897, which made him one of the oldest soccer club in Russia. During the 20th century the Club won the City's championship title multiple times.

It ceased to exist in 1923.

Honors 
 Saint-Petersburg City Championship (6): 1908, 1909, 1910, 1913, 1914, 1922

Football clubs in Saint Petersburg
Association football clubs established in 1897
Association football clubs established in 2019
1897 establishments in Europe
2019 establishments in Russia